Henry Frazier III (born March 20, 1968) is an American football coach and former player. He is the head football coach at Virginia State University, a position he has held since 2022. Frazier served as the head football coach at Bowie State University from 1999 to 2003, Prairie View A&M University from 2004 to 2010, and North Carolina Central University from 2011 to 2012.

Coaching career

Bowie State
Fraizer's first collegiate head coaching position was the head coach at Bowie State University for five seasons, from 1999 to 2003. At Bowie State, his teams produced a record of 26–24.

Prairie View A&M
In 2004 Frazier was named the 23rd head football coach at Prairie View A&M University in Prairie View, Texas. His record at Prairie View was 43–30. Upon his resignation at Prairie View A&M, Frazier was the second winningest coach in Prairie View A&M football history.

North Carolina Central
On December 16, 2010, Frazier was introduced as the 21st head coach of the North Carolina Central University Eagles. Frazier succeeded Mose Rison and inherited an Eagles team that posted a 3–8 record during the 2010 campaign. His contract was for five years, with a base salary of $225,000. On August 22, 2013, following a domestic dispute, NCCU's administration announced that Frazier was relieved of his duties as the head coach of the Eagles.

Virginia State
In May 2022, it was announced that Frazier would be returning to the sidelines as a head coach once again. He was hired as the head coach of the Virginia State Trojans.

Head coaching record

College

References

External links
 Virginia State profile
 Maryland profile

1968 births
Living people
American football quarterbacks
Bowie State Bulldogs football coaches
Bowie State Bulldogs football players
North Carolina Central Eagles football coaches
Prairie View A&M Panthers football coaches
Virginia State Trojans football coaches
High school football coaches in Maryland
Players of American football from Washington, D.C.
African-American coaches of American football
African-American players of American football
20th-century African-American sportspeople
21st-century African-American sportspeople